Abdoul Aziz Touré (born 8 September 1990) is a retired Malian football midfielder who plays for AS Bakaridjan.

References

1990 births
Living people
Malian footballers
Mali international footballers
CS Duguwolofila players
AS Real Bamako players
Association football midfielders
21st-century Malian people
Mali A' international footballers
2016 African Nations Championship players